Lusaghbyur is an abandoned village in the Ashtarak Municipality of the Aragatsotn Province of Armenia.

References

Former populated places in Aragatsotn Province